Norbury High School for Girls is a secondary school with academy status for girls aged 11–19. It is located in Thornton Heath, Greater London, England.

References

 

Academies in the London Borough of Croydon
Girls' schools in London
Training schools in England
Secondary schools in the London Borough of Croydon
Thornton Heath